Harris County Airport  is a county-owned public-use airport in Harris County, Georgia, United States. It is located two nautical miles (3.7 km) southwest of the central business district of Pine Mountain, Georgia. According to the FAA's National Plan of Integrated Airport Systems for 2009–2013, it is categorized as a general aviation facility. It was formerly known as Callaway Gardens-Harris County Airport.

Facilities and aircraft 
It has one runway designated 9/27 with an asphalt surface measuring 5,002 by 100 feet (1,525 x 30 m). For the 12-month period ending April 2, 2008, the airport had 6,000 general aviation aircraft operations, an average of 16 per day.

References

External links 
 Harris County Airport (PIM) at Georgia DOT website
 Aerial image as of 5 February 1999 from USGS The National Map
 
 

Airports in Georgia (U.S. state)
Buildings and structures in Harris County, Georgia
Transportation in Harris County, Georgia